Hydrobius is a genus of hydrophilid beetles that contains nine species distributed throughout the Holarctic realm.
Hydrobius arcticus Kuwert, 1890
Hydrobius convexus Brullé, 1835
Hydrobius fuscipes (Linnaeus, 1758)
Hydrobius melaenus (Germar, 1824)
Hydrobius orientalis Jia & Short, 2009
Hydrobius pauper Sharp, 1884
Hydrobius pui Jia, 1995
Hydrobius punctistriatus Jia, 1995
Hydrobius tumidus LeConte, 1835

References

External links

 Hydrobius on BugGuide

Hydrophilidae genera
Hydrophilinae